The Punany Poets was created by Author/Producer Jessica Holter in 1995 in response to the untimely death of rapper Eazy-E from AIDS complications. After a television feature on HBO Real Sex Episode 24: "Dirty Words", what began as a book of erotica, Punany The Hip Hop Psalms, with photos and AIDS awareness public service announcements, became a social group and touring theater company that is still active. The Punany Poets were brought back by popular demand on Real Sex 26: "Lessons in Love & Lust." Jessica Holter and The Punany Poets performed on Playboy TV's Night calls 411 with Tera Patrick and Chrystal Knight in 2002 and spent time on the couch with Lexington Steel on "Lex in the City" in 2003. In 2004 The Punany Poets made an appearance in the independent film Silence: In Search of Black Female Sexuality, Directed by Mya B.

In 2007, Holter sold her second poetry collection Verbal Penetration to Publisher, Author Zane, who published is through her imprint Strebor Book / Atria a subsidiary of Simon and Schuster. Holter also gave the company her first novel The Punany Experience: The War Between Tops and Bottoms in 2012, before ending her relationship with the company in favor of independent publishing. Holter published Verbal Penetration 2: The Vault in 2016. Punany: The Hip Hop Psalms has 5 books in the anthology series.

From the beginning, The Punany Poets have included an original musical score for there productions. Holter, who began her writing career as a hip Hop Entertainment journalist, hails from Oakland, CA and received assistance with music and marketing from Bay Area producers and artists such as Money B of Digital Underground, A Plus of Souls of Mischief, Conscious Daughters, Thomas McElroy, Lev Berlak and long time friend Dwayne Wiggins of Tony Toni Tone'. There are 5 music CD's among The Punany Poets growing archive of merchandise.

The original cast of The Punany Poets included Founder Jessica Holter, Rapper/Comedian Uptown Eebony Browne, Poet Branden Pernell, Goldie the Poet, Poet and Public Speaker Mahogany Brown, Lesbian poet Lucky Se7en, Author DJuna Blackmon, poet Yolanda Stevenson and dancers Mis little and Tracy Bartlow. Jessica Holter, who calls her productions "Sex Education Theater" shows, changes her cast every few years, but maintains a diverse collective of talent including poets, musicians, and dancers. Guest artists have included actor Max Julien, comedians Luenell and Sheryl Underwood and adult film stars Vanessa Blue and Sinnamon Love, who is also a poet and a nurse. Today, The Punany Poets' popular, live theater productions boast a fresh cast of performers as well as holistic health workers and include audience interaction such as public displays of affection and love confessions. With peak seasons during February for Valentine's Day and Black History Month, Sweetest Day in the Midwest, and gay pride events, The Punany Poets calendar stays full. When Holter is not touring, she is publishing books, music and DVD's created from her live productions.

The Punany Poets works have been included in college curriculum and are the subject of several dissertations, including 'Representin' the forbidden': The Punany Poets, black female sexuality, and HIV and performance by Monroe, Raquel LaMara, PhD, UNIVERSITY OF CALIFORNIA, LOS ANGELES 2006; 3244035. "Academics tend to be the only ones who read academic journal articles, thus such venues cannot be relied on to transmit important health information to the masses. Mass marketed public health messages reach large populations, encourage HIV testing, communicate the routes of infection, and explain how to protect oneself from infection; but they do not explore the intimate contexts that aggravate the spread of HIV. It is difficult for a thirty-second PSA to convey the intense contradictory emotions a woman or man, may feel when faced with the decision to use a condom in the heat of the moment. Likewise, it is unfair to assume that a thirty-minute sitcom with an HIV theme can provide comprehensive education on HIV. Again, the focus tends to be on testing and the routes of infection, which makes it easy for the viewer to tune out if it’s information they have previously heard or read. The Punany Poets, however, perform the intimate contexts. Their work speaks to women who maintain romantic relationships for financial security, in spite of continually contracting sexually transmitted diseases from their partners. Their work explores how childhood sexual abuse can potentially lead to self-destructive behavior like substance abuse. They show how to make condoms a seductive, fun part of the sex act. They address HIV by depicting the various socio-cultural, emotional, physical, and spiritual issues around it. The Punany Poets perform HIV interventions by specifically encouraging women to be proud of and take control of their sexuality, which is different from merely protecting yourself from a man. In the Punany paradigm, women are active agents, while public health messages tend to position them as passive ones," Author Raquel Monroe writes.

References

HIV/AIDS activism